The Awza'i school was one of the schools of Fiqh, the Islamic jurisprudence, or religious law within Sunni Islam in the 8th century.  Its Imam was Abd al-Rahman al-Awza'i.

History

In the Maghreb and al-Andalus
Since the Umayyad conquest and the Berber revolt, Morocco and western Algeria followed the Kharijites schools adopted by the ruling dynasties such as the Maghrawa, the emirate of Toudgha and the Ibadhi Rustamid dynasty. And, with the exception of Tunisia and al-Andalus, the Maliki school only became established in the region after the rise of the Almoravid dynasty.

Then during the rule of Al-Hakam I, the official fatwas were changed and given according to the opinion of Malik ibn Anas and the people of al-Madina. This was due to the opinion and preference of al-Hakam due to some political benefits he saw and they differ about the actual reason, which still remains unclear. Most hold that it was due to the scholars of al-Andalus travelling to Medina, then when they returned they spoke of the excellence of Malik, his wide knowledge and great station, so they honoured him and preferred his Madhhab. Others say that Imam Malik asked some of the people of al-Andalus about the rule in their region and they described it to him and Malik was very pleased by it since the Abbasids in that time did not rule in a manner that was agreeable. So, Imam Malik said to the person who told him, ‘We ask Allaah to enlighten our sacred precincts with your rule.’ This was transmitted to the ruler of al-Andalus, who already knew of the knowledge, excellence and piety of Malik; so he led the people to accept his Madhhab and ordered that the madhhab of al-Awza’i be abandoned. Later, the kings of Morocco and the west agreed that the rulings and actions should be according to the preferences of Ibn al-Qaasim al-`Utaqi (a famous student of Malik) only.

In Syria
In Syria, the Madhhab of al-Awza’i remained the main school of thought until the 10th century, when Abu Zar’ah Muhammed ibn Uthman of the Shafi’ee Madhhab was appointed judge of Damascus. Abu Zar’ah began the practice of giving a prize of 100 dinars to any student who memorized the book, Mukhtasr al-Muzanee (the basics of Shafi’ee fiqh). Naturally, the practice caused the Shafi’ee Madhhab to spread rapidly in Syria, until none of al-Awza’i’s followers remained until the 11th century. The second reason were because he instructed his principal student, Ammar ibn Sayf, to destroy and burn all of his works.

References

Islamic jurisprudence
Schools of Sunni jurisprudence